J. J. Clark may refer to:

John James Clark (1838–1915), often known as J. J. Clark, Australian architect
Joseph J. Clark (1893–1971), often known as J. J."Jocko" Clark, Admiral of the U.S. Navy in World War II